Elba is a city in Winona County, Minnesota, United States. The population was 152 at the 2010 census. It is on Minnesota State Highway 74 just north of Whitewater State Park.

History
Elba was laid out in 1856, and named after the island of Elba. The city was originally built up chiefly by ethnic Germans from Luxembourg. A post office was in operation at Elba from 1858 until 1965.

As a result of the 2007 Midwest flooding, the town was flooded when the dikes holding back the Whitewater River failed on August 18, 2007.

Geography

Demographics

2010 census
As of the census of 2010, there were 152 people, 70 households, and 44 families living in the city. The racial makeup of the city was 98.7% White and 1.3% from other races. Hispanic or Latino of any race were 3.3% of the population.

There were 70 households, of which 25.7% had children under the age of 18 living with them, 45.7% were married couples living together, 11.4% had a female householder with no husband present, 5.7% had a male householder with no wife present, and 37.1% were non-families. 32.9% of all households were made up of individuals, and 11.5% had someone living alone who was 65 years of age or older. The average household size was 2.17 and the average family size was 2.64.

The median age in the city was 45.3 years. 19.1% of residents were under the age of 18; 8.4% were between the ages of 18 and 24; 21.7% were from 25 to 44; 34.3% were from 45 to 64; and 16.4% were 65 years of age or older. The gender makeup of the city was 57.9% male and 42.1% female.

2000 census
As of the census of 2000, there were 214 people, 72 households, and 58 families living in the city. The racial makeup of the city was 100.00% White. Hispanic or Latino of any race were 1.40% of the population.

There were 72 households, out of which 51.4% had children under the age of 18 living with them, 58.3% were married couples living together, 6.9% had a female householder with no husband present, and 19.4% were non-families. 16.7% of all households were made up of individuals, and 12.5% had someone living alone who was 65 years of age or older.  The average household size was 2.97 and the average family size was 3.28.

In the city, the population was spread out, with 35.5% under the age of 18, 7.0% from 18 to 24, 30.4% from 25 to 44, 18.2% from 45 to 64, and 8.9% who were 65 years of age or older.  The median age was 31 years. For every 100 females, there were 107.8 males.  For every 100 females age 18 and over, there were 102.9 males.

The median income for a household in the city was $38,750, and the median income for a family was $41,042. Males had a median income of $30,156 versus $22,500 for females. The per capita income for the city was $14,398.  About 3.5% of families and 6.2% of the population were below the poverty line, including 5.9% of those under the age of eighteen and 8.7% of those 65 or over.

Education
Elba is part of the St. Charles School District.

References

External links
 Elba Minnesota Community Guide

Cities in Minnesota
German-American culture in Minnesota
Luxembourgian-American culture in Minnesota
Cities in Winona County, Minnesota